Oladele John Nihi (born 15 July 1988) is a Nigerian politician and activist serving as the Vice President West Africa of the Panafrican Youth Union, the official youth body of the African Union. He was the Honorable Commissioner for Youth Political Participation of the organization before his election as the Vice President West Africa in 2021. Prior to that, he served as one of the factional presidents of the National Youth Council of Nigeria from 2019 to 2020 but later resigned and initiated a peace and reconciliation move for the unity and progress of the organization.

Career
In 2015, Nihi founded of Youth Initiative Against Unlawful Emigration (YINAGUE) which is involved basically in education and advocacy among youth and young people to resist the temptation to risk their lives through illegal routes and means of emigration; and the Okun Illiteracy Eradication Foundation to fight against illiteracy in Okun land which is the Yoruba speaking part of Kogi State.

On 22 March 2017, Nihi declared his intention to contest for the chairmanship of Kogi State chapter of the National Youth Council of Nigeria in a press release.

In 2019, following the decision of Ikenga Imo Ugochinyere to resign, a congress was held and Oladele John Nihi was elected as the new president of the youth council. His election was recognized by the council and endorsed by the outgoing president. Shortly after, a leadership tussle broke out as 3 other members declared themselves as presidents. The factionalization and leadership crisis that rocked the NYCN brought the activities of the organization to a halt due to several court orders from the warring factions. Nihi would later step down after a peace accord was signed by all warring factions.

Nihi won in an election held in Niamey, Niger between 15-16 November 2021 and was declared the Vice President West Africa of the Panafrican Youth Union. Following his election, a formal reception was organized for him by the Federal Government of Nigeria through the Ministry of Youth and Sports Development. A grand reception event was also organized for him in Lokoja, the capital of Kogi State where he hails from.

Personal life 
He escaped death in 2015 when he drove into a ditch in an attempt to dodge a motorcycle rider who seemed to have lost control of his motorcycle on the Okene-Lokoja-Abuja Highway.

References 
14.  DABS Lounge Mgt. pays condolence visit to family of deceased staff, offers scholarship to younger sister. InsideStory News. 23 July 2022. Retrieved 23 August 2022.

Nigerian politicians
1988 births

Living people